{{DISPLAYTITLE:C21H32O4}}
The molecular formula C21H32O4 (molar mass: 348.48 g/mol) may refer to:

 Alfadolone
 5α-Dihydrocorticosterone, or 11β,21-dihydroxy-5α-pregnane-3,20-dione

Molecular formulas